The 2019 Rain or Shine Elasto Painters season was the 13th season of the franchise in the Philippine Basketball Association (PBA).

Key dates

2018
December 16: The 2018 PBA draft took place in Midtown Atrium, Robinson Place Manila.

Roster

Philippine Cup

Eliminations

Standings

Game log

|-bgcolor=ccffcc
| 1
| January 18
| NLEX
| W 96–87
| James Yap (20)
| Rey Nambatac (10)
| Beau Belga (7)
| Cuneta Astrodome
| 1–0
|-bgcolor=ccffcc
| 2
| January 26
| Barangay Ginebra
| W 83–80
| Borboran, Torres (12)
| Borboran, Mocon, Torres (8)
| Ahanmisi, Daquioag (4)
| Calasiao Sports Complex
| 2–0
|-bgcolor=ffcccc
| 3
| January 30
| Blackwater
| L 99–111
| James Yap (20)
| Ahanmisi, Mocon (8)
| Ahanmisi, Belga (4)
| Cuneta Astrodome
| 2–1

|-bgcolor=ccffcc
| 4
| February 1
| San Miguel
| W 108–98
| James Yap (21)
| Javee Mocon (17)
| Almazan, Mocon (4)
| Ynares Center
| 3–1
|-bgcolor=ccffcc
| 5
| February 3
| Alaska
| W 85–72
| Rey Nambatac (12)
| Maverick Ahanmisi (14)
| Ahanmisi, Belga (5)
| Mall of Asia Arena
| 4–1
|-bgcolor=ccffcc
| 6
| February 8
| NorthPort
| W 107–100
| Belga, Yap (19)
| Maverick Ahanmisi (7)
| Beau Belga (7)
| Mall of Asia Arena
| 5–1
|-bgcolor=ccffcc
| 7
| February 10
| Phoenix
| W 98–94 (OT)
| Belga, Rosales (16)
| Beau Belga (9)
| Beau Belga (7)
| Smart Araneta Coliseum
| 6–1
|-bgcolor=ccffcc
| 8
| February 13
| Magnolia
| W 75–74
| James Yap (18)
| Raymond Almazan (14)
| Ahanmisi, Almazan (3)
| Mall of Asia Arena
| 7–1

|-bgcolor=ffcccc
| 9
| March 3
| TNT
| L 92–100
| James Yap (18)
| Ahanmisi, Belga (7)
| Belga, Mocon (4)
| Ynares Center
| 7–2
|-bgcolor=ffcccc
| 10
| March 6
| Columbian
| L 82–85
| Mark Borboran (21)
| Javee Mocon (9)
| Maverick Ahanmisi (5)
| Smart Araneta Coliseum
| 7–3
|-bgcolor=ccffcc
| 11
| March 15
| Meralco
| W 88–85
| James Yap (14)
| Beau Belga (11)
| Ahanmisi, Belga, Mocon, Yap (3)
| Cuneta Astrodome
| 8–3

Playoffs

Bracket

Game log

|-bgcolor=ccffcc
| 1
| April 7
| NorthPort
| W 91–85
| Ed Daquioag (15)
| Javee Mocon (7)
| Belga, Daquioag (4)
| Mall of Asia Arena
| 1–0

|-bgcolor=ccffcc
| 1
| April 12
| Magnolia
| W 84–77
| Javee Mocon (15)
| Javee Mocon (10)
| Rey Nambatac (4)
| Smart Araneta Coliseum
| 1–0
|-bgcolor=ccffcc
| 2
| April 14
| Magnolia
| W 93–80
| Ed Daquioag (19)
| Javee Mocon (6)
| Gabe Norwood (5)
| Smart Araneta Coliseum
| 2–0
|-bgcolor=ffcccc
| 3
| April 16
| Magnolia
| L 74–85
| Javee Mocon (18)
| Mocon, Norwood (9)
| Gabe Norwood (4)
| Smart Araneta Coliseum
| 2–1
|-bgcolor=ffcccc
| 4
| April 22
| Magnolia
| L 91–94
| James Yap (24)
| Gabe Norwood (8)
| Beau Belga (3)
| Smart Araneta Coliseum
| 2–2
|-bgcolor=ffcccc
| 5
| April 24
| Magnolia
| L 74–82
| Gabe Norwood (15)
| Beau Belga (10)
| Ahanmisi, Belga, Rosales (3)
| Cuneta Astrodome
| 2–3
|-bgcolor=ccffcc
| 6
| April 26
| Magnolia
| W 91–81
| Nambatac, Yap (16)
| Gabe Norwood (10)
| Ahanmisi, Belga (4)
| Ynares Center
| 3–3
|-bgcolor=ffcccc
| 7
| April 28
| Magnolia
| L 60–63 (OT)
| James Yap (14)
| Ahanmisi, Norwood (7)
| Gabe Norwood (4)
| Mall of Asia Arena
| 3–4

Commissioner's Cup

Eliminations

Standings

Game log

|-bgcolor=ffcccc
| 1
| May 31
| Meralco
| L 84–91
| Denzel Bowles (31)
| Denzel Bowles (13)
| Bowles, Mocon (4)
| Mall of Asia Arena
| 0–1

|-bgcolor=ffcccc
| 2
| June 2
| Blackwater
| L 92–98
| Denzel Bowles (27)
| James Yap (8)
| James Yap (5)
| Ynares Center
| 0–2
|-bgcolor=ccffcc
| 3
| June 7
| Barangay Ginebra
| W 104–81
| Rey Nambatac (30)
| Denzel Bowles (17)
| Beau Belga (7)
| Smart Araneta Coliseum
| 1–2
|-bgcolor=ccffcc
| 4
| June 9
| Phoenix
| W 89–82
| Denzel Bowles (28)
| Denzel Bowles (14)
| Denzel Bowles (5)
| Ynares Center
| 2–2
|-bgcolor=ffcccc
| 5
| June 19
| NorthPort
| L 105–107 (OT)
| Denzel Bowles (41)
| Denzel Bowles (21)
| Javee Mocon (8)
| Mall of Asia Arena
| 2–3
|-bgcolor=ccffcc
| 6
| June 23
| Columbian
| W 88–86 (OT)
| Denzel Bowles (29)
| Denzel Bowles (14)
| Denzel Bowles (10)
| Batangas City Coliseum
| 3–3
|-bgcolor=ffcccc
| 7
| June 28
| NLEX
| L 97–100
| Denzel Bowles (35)
| Denzel Bowles (9)
| Javee Mocon (8)
| Smart Araneta Coliseum
| 3–4

|-bgcolor=ffcccc
| 8
| July 3
| TNT
| L 81–102
| Denzel Bowles (28)
| Javee Mocon (10)
| Mocon, Rosales (5)
| Smart Araneta Coliseum
| 3–5
|-bgcolor=ccffcc
| 9
| July 6
| Alaska
| W 86–84
| Denzel Bowles (16)
| Beau Belga (7)
| Beau Belga (5)
| Mall of Asia Arena
| 4–5
|-bgcolor=ccffcc
| 10
| July 10
| Magnolia
| W 86–82
| Beau Belga (22)
| Carl Montgomery (12)
| Rey Nambatac (5)
| Smart Araneta Coliseum
| 5–5
|-bgcolor=ffcccc
| 11
| July 13
| San Miguel
| L 87–89
| Javee Mocon (20)
| Carl Montgomery (13)
| Javee Mocon (5)
| Xavier University Gym
| 5–6

Playoffs

Bracket

Game log

|-bgcolor=ccffcc
| 1
| July 20
| Blackwater
| W 83–80
| Ed Daquioag (19)
| Carl Montgomery (19)
| Belga, Borboran, Daquioag (3)
| Mall of Asia Arena
| 1–0
|-bgcolor=ffcccc
| 2
| July 23
| Blackwater
| L 96–100
| Javee Mocon (25)
| Carl Montgomery (15)
| Kris Rosales (5)
| Smart Araneta Coliseum
| 1–1
|-bgcolor=ccffcc
| 3
| July 25
| Blackwater
| W 85–83
| Rey Nambatac (21)
| Carl Montgomery (23)
| Javee Mocon (6)
| Smart Araneta Coliseum
| 2–1

|-bgcolor=ffcccc
| 1
| July 27
| San Miguel
| L 105–111
| Carl Montgomery (20)
| Carl Montgomery (17)
| Javee Mocon (8)
| Smart Araneta Coliseum
| 0–1
|-bgcolor=ffcccc
| 2
| July 29
| San Miguel
| L 105–117
| Carl Montgomery (24)
| Carl Montgomery (15)
| Carl Montgomery (6)
| Mall of Asia Arena
| 0–2
|-bgcolor=ccffcc
| 3
| July 31
| San Miguel
| W 112–104
| Carl Montgomery (25)
| Carl Montgomery (15)
| Beau Belga (6)
| Smart Araneta Coliseum
| 1–2
|-bgcolor=ffcccc
| 4
| August 2
| San Miguel
| L 95–98
| Carl Montgomery (18)
| Carl Montgomery (17)
| Carl Montgomery (7)
| Smart Araneta Coliseum
| 1–3

Governors' Cup

Eliminations

Standings

Game log

|-bgcolor=ffcccc
| 1
| September 20
| NorthPort
| L 94–99
| Joel Wright (22)
| Joel Wright (14)
| Rey Nambatac (5)
| Mall of Asia Arena
| 0–1
|-bgcolor=ccffcc
| 2
| September 22
| Columbian
| W 96–90
| Joel Wright (30)
| Joel Wright (10)
| Ed Daquioag (3)
| Smart Araneta Coliseum
| 1–1
|-bgcolor=ffcccc
| 3
| September 28
| TNT
| L 91–103
| Joel Wright (20)
| Joel Wright (8)
| Joel Wright (3)
| Smart Araneta Coliseum
| 1–2

|-bgcolor=ffcccc
| 4 
| October 4 
| Magnolia 
| L 68–69 
| Javee Mocon (14) 
| Kayel Locke (9) 
| Chris Exciminiano (3) 
| Smart Araneta Coliseum 
| 1–3
|-bgcolor=ffcccc
| 5
| October 9
| Phoenix 
| L 84–86 
| Kayel Locke (29)
| Javee Mocon (14) 
| Kayel Locke (4) 
| Cuneta Astrodome 
| 1–4
|-bgcolor=ffcccc
| 6
| October 13
| Alaska 
| L 71–78 
| Kayel Locke (25)
| Kayel Locke (10) 
| Beau Belga (5) 
| Smart Araneta Coliseum 
| 1–5
|-bgcolor=ccffcc
| 7
| October 23
| Blackwater 
| W 99–82 
| Rey Nambatac (18)
| Kwame Alexander (16) 
| Rey Nambatac (7) 
| Cuneta Astrodome 
| 2–5
|-bgcolor=ffcccc
| 8
| October 26
| Barangay Ginebra 
| L 89–98 
| Kwame Alexander (20)
| Kwame Alexander (10) 
| Beau Belga (6) 
| Smart Araneta Coliseum 
| 2–6
|-bgcolor=ffcccc
| 9
| October 30
| NLEX 
| L 91–111 
| Richard Ross (20)
| Mocon, Norwood, Ross (8) 
| Gabe Norwood (5) 
| Cuneta Astrodome 
| 2–7

|-bgcolor=ccffcc
| 10
| November 9
| San Miguel 
| W 91–85 
| Mocon, Ross (16) 
| Javee Mocon (14) 
| Mocon, Ross (4) 
| Hoops Dome 
| 3–7
|-bgcolor=ccffcc
| 11
| November 17
| Meralco 
| W 83–81 
| Richard Ross (26)
| Richard Ross (12) 
| Belga, Nambatac (4) 
| Cuneta Astrodome 
| 4–7

Transactions

Commissioner's Cup

Awards

References

Rain or Shine Elasto Painters seasons
Rain or Shine Elasto Painters